Information retrieval (IR) in computing and information science is the process of obtaining information system resources that are relevant to an information need from a collection of those resources.  Searches can be based on full-text or other content-based indexing. Information retrieval is the science of searching for information in a document, searching for documents themselves, and also searching for the metadata that describes data, and for databases of texts, images or sounds.

Automated information retrieval systems are used to reduce what has been called information overload. An IR system is a software system that provides access to books, journals and other documents; stores and manages those documents. Web search engines are the most visible IR applications.

Overview 
An information retrieval process begins when a user or searcher enters a query into the system. Queries are formal statements of information needs, for example search strings in web search engines. In information retrieval a query does not uniquely identify a single object in the collection. Instead, several objects may match the query, perhaps with different degrees of relevance.

An object is an entity that is represented by information in a content collection or database. User queries are matched against the database information. However, as opposed to classical SQL queries of a database, in information retrieval the results returned may or may not match the query, so results are typically ranked. This ranking of results is a key difference of information retrieval searching compared to database searching.

Depending on the application the data objects may be, for example, text documents, images, audio, mind maps or videos. Often the documents themselves are not kept or stored directly in the IR system, but are instead represented in the system by document surrogates or metadata.

Most IR systems compute a numeric score on how well each object in the database matches the query, and rank the objects according to this value. The top ranking objects are then shown to the user. The process may then be iterated if the user wishes to refine the query.

History 

The idea of using computers to search for relevant pieces of information was popularized in the article As We May Think by Vannevar Bush in 1945. It would appear that Bush was inspired by patents for a 'statistical machine' - filed by Emanuel Goldberg in the 1920s and '30s - that searched for documents stored on film. The first description of a computer searching for information was described by Holmstrom in 1948, detailing an early mention of the Univac computer. Automated information retrieval systems were introduced in the 1950s: one even featured in the 1957 romantic comedy, Desk Set. In the 1960s, the first large information retrieval research group was formed by Gerard Salton at Cornell. By the 1970s several different retrieval techniques had been shown to perform well on small text corpora such as the Cranfield collection (several thousand documents). Large-scale retrieval systems, such as the Lockheed Dialog system, came into use early in the 1970s.

In 1992, the US Department of Defense along with the National Institute of Standards and Technology (NIST), cosponsored the Text Retrieval Conference (TREC) as part of the TIPSTER text program. The aim of this was to look into the information retrieval community by supplying the infrastructure that was needed for evaluation of text retrieval methodologies on a very large text collection. This catalyzed research on methods that scale to huge corpora. The introduction of web search engines has boosted the need for very large scale retrieval systems even further.

Applications
Areas where information retrieval techniques are employed include (the entries are in alphabetical order within each category):

General applications
 Digital libraries
  Information filtering
 Recommender systems
  Media search
 Blog search
 Image retrieval
 3D retrieval
 Music retrieval
 News search
 Speech retrieval
 Video retrieval
 Search engines
 Site search
 Desktop search
 Enterprise search
 Federated search
 Mobile search
 Social search
 Web search

Domain-specific applications
 Expert search finding
 Genomic information retrieval
 Geographic information retrieval
  Information retrieval for chemical structures
 Information retrieval in software engineering
 Legal information retrieval
 Vertical search

Other retrieval methods
Methods/Techniques in which information retrieval techniques are employed include:
 Adversarial information retrieval
 Automatic summarization
Multi-document summarization
 Compound term processing
 Cross-lingual retrieval
 Document classification
 Spam filtering
 Question answering

Model types 

For effectively retrieving relevant documents by IR strategies, the documents are typically transformed into a suitable representation. Each retrieval strategy incorporates a specific model for its document representation purposes. The picture on the right illustrates the relationship of some common models. In the picture, the models are categorized according to two dimensions: the mathematical basis and the properties of the model.

First dimension: mathematical basis 
 Set-theoretic models represent documents as sets of words or phrases. Similarities are usually derived from set-theoretic operations on those sets. Common models are:
 Standard Boolean model
 Extended Boolean model
 Fuzzy retrieval
 Algebraic models represent documents and queries usually as vectors, matrices, or tuples. The similarity of the query vector and document vector is represented as a scalar value.
 Vector space model
 Generalized vector space model
 (Enhanced) Topic-based Vector Space Model
 Extended Boolean model
 Latent semantic indexing a.k.a. latent semantic analysis
 Probabilistic models treat the process of document retrieval as a probabilistic inference. Similarities are computed as probabilities that a document is relevant for a given query. Probabilistic theorems like the Bayes' theorem are often used in these models.
 Binary Independence Model
 Probabilistic relevance model on which is based the okapi (BM25) relevance function
 Uncertain inference
 Language models
 Divergence-from-randomness model
 Latent Dirichlet allocation
 Feature-based retrieval models view documents as vectors of values of feature functions (or just features) and seek the best way to combine these features into a single relevance score, typically by learning to rank methods. Feature functions are arbitrary functions of document and query, and as such can easily incorporate almost any other retrieval model as just another feature.

Second dimension: properties of the model 
 Models without term-interdependencies treat different terms/words as independent. This fact is usually represented in vector space models by the orthogonality assumption of term vectors or in probabilistic models by an independency assumption for term variables.
 Models with immanent term interdependencies allow a representation of interdependencies between terms. However the degree of the interdependency between two terms is defined by the model itself. It is usually directly or indirectly derived (e.g. by dimensional reduction) from the co-occurrence of those terms in the whole set of documents.
 Models with transcendent term interdependencies allow a representation of interdependencies between terms, but they do not allege how the interdependency between two terms is defined. They rely an external source for the degree of interdependency between two terms. (For example, a human or sophisticated algorithms.)

Performance and correctness measures 

The evaluation of an information retrieval system' is the process of assessing how well a system meets the information needs of its users. In general, measurement considers a collection of documents to be searched and a search query. Traditional evaluation metrics, designed for Boolean retrieval or top-k retrieval, include precision and recall. All measures assume a ground truth notion of relevance: every document is known to be either relevant or non-relevant to a particular query. In practice, queries may be ill-posed and there may be different shades of relevance.

Timeline 

 Before the 1900s
 1801: Joseph Marie Jacquard invents the Jacquard loom, the first machine to use punched cards to control a sequence of operations.
 1880s: Herman Hollerith invents an electro-mechanical data tabulator using punch cards as a machine readable medium.
 1890 Hollerith cards, keypunches and tabulators used to process the 1890 US Census data.
 1920s-1930s
 Emanuel Goldberg submits patents for his "Statistical Machine” a document search engine that used photoelectric cells and pattern recognition to search the metadata on rolls of microfilmed documents.
 1940s–1950s
 late 1940s: The US military confronted problems of indexing and retrieval of wartime scientific research documents captured from Germans.
 1945: Vannevar Bush's As We May Think appeared in Atlantic Monthly.
 1947: Hans Peter Luhn (research engineer at IBM since 1941) began work on a mechanized punch card-based system for searching chemical compounds.
 1950s: Growing concern in the US for a "science gap" with the USSR motivated, encouraged funding and provided a backdrop for mechanized literature searching systems (Allen Kent et al.) and the invention of the citation index by Eugene Garfield.
 1950: The term "information retrieval" was coined by Calvin Mooers.
 1951: Philip Bagley conducted the earliest experiment in computerized document retrieval in a master thesis at MIT.
 1955: Allen Kent joined Case Western Reserve University, and eventually became associate director of the Center for Documentation and Communications Research. That same year, Kent and colleagues published a paper in American Documentation describing the precision and recall measures as well as detailing a proposed "framework" for evaluating an IR system which included statistical sampling methods for determining the number of relevant documents not retrieved.
 1958: International Conference on Scientific Information Washington DC included consideration of IR systems as a solution to problems identified. See: Proceedings of the International Conference on Scientific Information, 1958 (National Academy of Sciences, Washington, DC, 1959)
 1959: Hans Peter Luhn published "Auto-encoding of documents for information retrieval."
 1960s:
 early 1960s: Gerard Salton began work on IR at Harvard, later moved to Cornell.
 1960: Melvin Earl Maron and John Lary Kuhns published "On relevance, probabilistic indexing, and information retrieval" in the Journal of the ACM 7(3):216–244, July 1960.
 1962:
 Cyril W. Cleverdon published early findings of the Cranfield studies, developing a model for IR system evaluation. See: Cyril W. Cleverdon, "Report on the Testing and Analysis of an Investigation into the Comparative Efficiency of Indexing Systems". Cranfield Collection of Aeronautics, Cranfield, England, 1962.
 Kent published Information Analysis and Retrieval.
 1963:
 Weinberg report "Science, Government and Information" gave a full articulation of the idea of a "crisis of scientific information."  The report was named after Dr. Alvin Weinberg.
 Joseph Becker and Robert M. Hayes published text on information retrieval. Becker, Joseph; Hayes, Robert Mayo. Information storage and retrieval: tools, elements, theories. New York, Wiley (1963).
 1964:
 Karen Spärck Jones finished her thesis at Cambridge, Synonymy and Semantic Classification, and continued work on computational linguistics as it applies to IR.
 The National Bureau of Standards sponsored a symposium titled "Statistical Association Methods for Mechanized Documentation." Several highly significant papers, including G. Salton's first published reference (we believe) to the SMART system.
mid-1960s:
 National Library of Medicine developed MEDLARS Medical Literature Analysis and Retrieval System, the first major machine-readable database and batch-retrieval system.
 Project Intrex at MIT.
 1965: J. C. R. Licklider published Libraries of the Future.
 1966: Don Swanson was involved in studies at University of Chicago on Requirements for Future Catalogs.
 late 1960s: F. Wilfrid Lancaster completed evaluation studies of the MEDLARS system and published the first edition of his text on information retrieval.
 1968:
 Gerard Salton published Automatic Information Organization and Retrieval.
 John W. Sammon, Jr.'s RADC Tech report "Some Mathematics of Information Storage and Retrieval..." outlined the vector model.
 1969: Sammon's "A nonlinear mapping for data structure analysis " (IEEE Transactions on Computers) was the first proposal for visualization interface to an IR system.
 1970s
 early 1970s:
 First online systems—NLM's AIM-TWX, MEDLINE; Lockheed's Dialog; SDC's ORBIT.
 Theodor Nelson promoting concept of hypertext, published Computer Lib/Dream Machines.
 1971: Nicholas Jardine and Cornelis J. van Rijsbergen published "The use of hierarchic clustering in information retrieval", which articulated the "cluster hypothesis."
 1975: Three highly influential publications by Salton fully articulated his vector processing framework and  term discrimination model:
 A Theory of Indexing (Society for Industrial and Applied Mathematics)
 A Theory of Term Importance in Automatic Text Analysis (JASIS v. 26)
 A Vector Space Model for Automatic Indexing (CACM 18:11)
 1978: The First ACM SIGIR conference.
 1979: C. J. van Rijsbergen published Information Retrieval (Butterworths). Heavy emphasis on probabilistic models.
 1979: Tamas Doszkocs implemented the CITE natural language user interface for MEDLINE at the National Library of Medicine. The CITE system supported free form query input, ranked output and relevance feedback.
 1980s
 1980: First international ACM SIGIR conference, joint with British Computer Society IR group in Cambridge.
 1982: Nicholas J. Belkin, Robert N. Oddy, and Helen M. Brooks proposed the ASK (Anomalous State of Knowledge) viewpoint for information retrieval. This was an important concept, though their automated analysis tool proved ultimately disappointing.
 1983: Salton (and Michael J. McGill) published Introduction to Modern Information Retrieval (McGraw-Hill), with heavy emphasis on vector models.
 1985: David Blair and Bill Maron publish: An Evaluation of Retrieval Effectiveness for a Full-Text Document-Retrieval System
 mid-1980s: Efforts to develop end-user versions of commercial IR systems.
 1985–1993: Key papers on and experimental systems for visualization interfaces.
 Work by Donald B. Crouch, Robert R. Korfhage, Matthew Chalmers, Anselm Spoerri and others.
 1989: First World Wide Web proposals by Tim Berners-Lee at CERN.
 1990s
 1992: First TREC conference.
 1997: Publication of Korfhage's Information Storage and Retrieval with emphasis on visualization and multi-reference point systems.
 1999: Publication of Ricardo Baeza-Yates and Berthier Ribeiro-Neto's Modern Information Retrieval by Addison Wesley, the first book that attempts to cover all IR. 
 late 1990s: Web search engines implementation of many features formerly found only in experimental IR systems. Search engines become the most common and maybe best instantiation of IR models.

Major conferences 
 SIGIR: Conference on Research and Development in Information Retrieval
 ECIR: European Conference on Information Retrieval
 CIKM: Conference on Information and Knowledge Management
 WWW: International World Wide Web Conference
 WSDM: Conference on Web Search and Data Mining
 ICTIR: International Conference on Theory of Information Retrieval

Awards in the field 

 Tony Kent Strix award
 Gerard Salton Award
 Karen Spärck Jones Award

See also

References

Further reading
 Ricardo Baeza-Yates, Berthier Ribeiro-Neto. Modern Information Retrieval: The Concepts and Technology behind Search (second edition) . Addison-Wesley, UK, 2011.
 Stefan Büttcher, Charles L. A. Clarke, and Gordon V. Cormack. Information Retrieval: Implementing and Evaluating Search Engines . MIT Press, Cambridge, Massachusetts, 2010.

 Christopher D. Manning, Prabhakar Raghavan, and Hinrich Schütze. Introduction to Information Retrieval. Cambridge University Press, 2008.

External links

ACM SIGIR: Information Retrieval Special Interest Group
BCS IRSG: British Computer Society - Information Retrieval Specialist Group
Text Retrieval Conference (TREC)
Forum for Information Retrieval Evaluation (FIRE)
Information Retrieval (online book) by C. J. van Rijsbergen
Information Retrieval Wiki 
Information Retrieval Facility 
Information Retrieval @ DUTH
TREC report on information retrieval evaluation techniques
How eBay measures search relevance
Information retrieval performance evaluation tool @ Athena Research Centre

 
Natural language processing